Koen Metsu (born 23 July 1981) is a Belgian politician for the N-VA.

Biography
Metsu has been an MP in the Belgian Chamber of Representatives since the 2014 Belgian federal elections. He was reelected in 2019. In addition, he has been a municipal councilor in Edegem since 2012 and has served as mayor of Edegem since 2018.

Outside of politics, Metsu is a graduate of the University of Antwerp. He has also worked with SOS Children's Village and the Vlaams Economisch Verbond.

References 

Living people
1981 births
21st-century Belgian politicians
New Flemish Alliance politicians
Members of the Chamber of Representatives (Belgium)
University of Antwerp alumni
Mayors of places in Belgium